Royal Air Force Cranwell or more simply RAF Cranwell  is a Royal Air Force station in Lincolnshire, England, close to the village of Cranwell, near Sleaford. Among other functions, it is home to the Royal Air Force College (RAFC), which trains the RAF's new officers and Aircrew. The motto, Altium Altrix, meaning "Nurture the highest" appears above the main doors of the Officers Mess. RAF Cranwell is currently commanded by Group Captain Joanne Campbell.

History

The history of military aviation at Cranwell goes back to November 1915, when the Admiralty requisitioned 2,500 acres (10 km2) of land from the Marquess of Bristol's estate. On 1 April 1916, the "Royal Naval Air Service Training Establishment, Cranwell" was officially born.

In 1917 a dedicated railway station was established for the RNAS establishment on a new single track branch line from Sleaford, the train being known as The Cranwell Flyer.

With the establishment of the Royal Air Force as an independent service in 1918, the RNAS Training Establishment became RAF Cranwell. The Royal Air Force College Cranwell was formed on 1 November 1919 as the RAF (Cadet) College.

Role and operations

Royal Air Force College 
Cranwell is home to the Royal Air Force College (RAFC), which overseas all RAF phase 1 Training. The RAF Officer Training Academy (RAFOTA) is the sub organisation of the RAFC which trains the RAFs new officers on a 24-week modularised initial officer training course (MIOTC), after which they are dispersed to their Phase II training for specific branch instruction. It is thus the RAF equivalent of the Royal Military Academy Sandhurst or the Britannia Royal Naval College.

RAF Recruitment 
The station is home to the Officer and Aircrew Selection Centre (OASC), where all applicants to the RAF as Officers or non-commissioned aircrew, are put through a rigorous selection process.

Headquarters Central Flying School
HQ CFS has been located at RAF Cranwell since 1995 when it moved from RAF Scampton. The Central Flying School currently trains all RAF QFI flying instructors.

No. 3 Flying Training School 
Cranwell is home to the headquarters of No. 3 Flying Training School (No. 3 FTS). The school provides elementary flying training for fixed wing and multi-engine student pilots from the RAF and Fleet Air Arm through No. 57 (Reserve) Squadron and No. 703 Naval Air Squadron. The UK Military Flying Training System (UKMFTS) operates the Grob Prefect T1 in this role. Although nominally based at Cranwell, elementary training largely takes place at nearby RAF Barkston Heath. After elementary training, aircrews streamed to fly multi-engine aircraft and rear-seat roles are trained by No. 45(R) Squadron, which operate five Embraer Phenom 100.

On 16 January 2018, the Skyes Building was opened at Cranwell by Air Marshal Sean Reynolds, the Deputy Commander Capability and Senior Responsible Owner of the UKMFTS. The building acts as a UKMFTS operational support building and is used to train new RAF pilots. It was named after Air-Vice Marshal Sir Frederick Hugh Sykes, a British military officer and politician who served during the First World War.

Air Cadets 
Since the mid-1990s, Cranwell has been home to Headquarters, Air Cadets, and the Air Cadet Organisation's Adult Training Facility.

Based units 

The following notable flying and non-flying units are based at RAF Cranwell.

Royal Air Force 
No. 22 Group (Training) RAF
 RAF College Cranwell
 Royal Air Force Officer Training Academy (RAF OTA)
Recruitment and Selection
Tedder Academy
 Defence College of Aeronautical Engineering (DCAE)
Officer Training
 Central Flying School
 Central Flying School Headquarters 
 No. 3 Flying Training School
 No. 3 Flying Training School Headquarters
 No. 45 Squadron – Embraer Phenom T1
 No. 57 Squadron – Grob Prefect T1
 No. 6 Flying Training School
 No. 6 Flying Training School Headquarters
 East Midlands Universities Air Squadron – Grob Tutor T1
 No. 7 Air Experience Flight – Grob Tutor T1
Royal Air Force Air Cadets Headquarters
No. 2 Group (Air Combat Support) RAF
No. 8 RAF Force Protection Wing
 No. 5 RAF Police Squadron
 RAF Police Specialist Investigations Branch (North)
No. 38 Group (Air Combat Service Support) RAF
 RAF Music Services
 The Band of the Royal Air Force College
 The Band of the Royal Auxiliary Air Force
RAF Air Warfare Centre
Air Warfare School
Other RAF Units
RAF Disclosures

Civilian 
 RAF Cranwell Flying Club
 Cranwell Gliding Club

See also
List of Royal Air Force stations
Cranwell Light Aeroplane Club
RAF Harlaxton – satellite airfield of Cranwell during the 1940s and 1950s

References

Citations

Bibliography
 Halpenny, Bruce Barrymore. 1981. Action Stations Vol.2: Wartime Military Airfields of Lincolnshire and the East Midlands

External links

 
 Cranwell Gliding Club
 UK Military Aeronautical Information Publication – Cranwell (EGYD)

Royal Air Force stations in Lincolnshire
Airports in England